The Boa Nova Wildlife Refuge is a  wildlife reserve in the state of Bahia, Brazil.

Location

The Boa Nova Wildlife Refuge is in the municipality of Boa Nova, Bahia.
It adjoins segments of the Boa Nova National Park.
The purpose is to fully protect and regenerate the natural ecosystems in the transition between Atlantic Forest and Caatinga, to maintain viable populations of endangered mammals and species of birds, particularly the slender antbird (Rhopornis ardesiacus), to maintain and restore waterways and watersheds, and to enable scientific research, education, environmental interpretation, recreation in contact with nature and ecotourism.

History

A public consultation on creating a national park and wildlife refuge in the south of Boa Nova was arranged by the Brazilian Institute of Environment and Renewable Natural Resources (IBAMA) on 14 December 2006.

It became part of the Central Atlantic Forest Ecological Corridor, created in 2002.
The consultative council for the reserve was created on 27 August 2015.

Notes

Sources

Wildlife reserves of Brazil
Protected areas of Bahia
2010 establishments in Brazil